Ben Betts (born 28 August 1996) is an Irish rugby union player for Nottingham  in the RFU Championship, the second division of English rugby union. During his rugby career, Betts, a prop, has also played for English clubs Leicester Tigers, Loughborough Students, Ealing Trailfinders, and Doncaster Knights, as well as spending time on loan in Australia with Sydney University. Internationally, Betts represented his native Ireland at under-20 level.

Early life
Born in Limerick, Betts went to school at Tarbert Comprehensive school in County Kerry. He first began playing rugby for Estuary RFC in Shanagolden, County Limerick but, after a year with the club, he then moved to Young Munster. He represented Munster at youth, under-19 and under-20 level, whilst also representing Ireland at under-18 clubs, under-19 and under-20 level.

Career
Betts was named in the Ireland squad for the 2016 World Rugby Under 20 Championship but, despite featuring strongly in Ireland's run to the final, he was not offered a professional contract by the IRFU or Munster. Instead, Betts moved across the Irish sea to Leicester Tigers.

Betts made his Leicester debut on 28 January 2017, coming off the bench in the 2016–17 Anglo-Welsh Cup against Northampton Saints at Welford Road. He spent the season on a dual-registration deal with Loughborough Students in National League 1, before spending a summer loan spell with Sydney University in Australia.

In April 2018, Ealing Trailfinders, who compete in the RFU Championship, announced that Betts would be joining them from the 2018–19 season. Betts joined another English side, Nottingham, on loan for the 2019–20 season, before leaving Ealing on a permanent basis to join fellow Championship side Doncaster Knights ahead of the 2020–21 season. However, Betts was released from his contract by Doncaster in July 2020 after he decided to retire from playing rugby to focus on interests outside of rugby. Despite this Betts re-joined Nottingham in March 2021 as the club assembled a squad for the COVID-19-delayed 2020–21 RFU Championship.

References

External links
Leicester Tigers Profile
U20 Six Nations Profile

1996 births
Living people
Rugby union players from County Limerick
Irish rugby union players
Young Munster players
Leicester Tigers players
Loughborough Students RUFC players
Ealing Trailfinders Rugby Club players
Nottingham R.F.C. players
Doncaster Knights players
Rugby union props